Travis L. Williams (born July 24, 1972) is a former NCAA Division I & II Head Men's Basketball coach at Tennessee State and Fort Valley State University, assistant coach at Georgia State, Mercer, & Chicago State University

Biography

Travis Williams is president and CEO of Academics & Athletics Consulting (AAC) focusing on “Educating, Empowering, & Mentoring Tomorrow’s Collegiate Athletic Leaders”.  Williams is high energy, high character, a proven coach, recruiter, player development, motivational speaker, academics and athletics consultant, and winner on all levels.  Throughout Williams’ academic, playing and coaching career, sports has displayed a great framework for citizenship, sportsmanship, communication, team work, leadership, time management, and setting individual and team goals both academically and athletically.  He has always shown an outstanding level of loyalty, dignity, morals, and genuine concern for the well-being of student-athletes throughout his illustrious career on and off the court, in the community, but more importantly in the classroom.

Williams is also the executive director and founder of “HBCU All-Stars LLC”, a black-owned sports marketing and event “Advocating, Educating, Exposing, Mentoring, and Investing in HBCUs, student-athletes, and coaches across the country. 

HBCU All-Stars LLC mission is showcasing “The Best in Black College Basketball in HBCU All-Star Game Experiences, bringing much-needed exposure, visibility, & recognition to outstanding, talented, and hard-working HBCU student-athletes, and brilliant coaches from around the country. In addition, he chairs the “Travis L. Williams Foundation” impacting & mentoring youth in academic, athletic, & nutritional enrichment programs, real life skills & experiences. Williams is a community activists and founder of “Coaches for Change Movement (CFCM)” standing against systemic racism in all its forms, social & economic injustice, police brutality, and voter suppression and making sure ALL athletes, males, and females are educated and informed about what's going on today's every changing society.

He currently hosts his weekly Tuesdays Instagram Live talk show “In the Loop with Travis Williams - Exclusive Conversations”. The talk show is inspiring viewers through sports, faith, family, education, health, and all subjects that matter. Travis L. Williams is Motivational Speaker & Educational Consultant, and former 18-year NCAA Division I & II, and High School Head Men's Basketball Coach. He has strong Christian faith, a loving, caring family, beautiful wife, Kya and two adorable children, Teagan (9) & Travis Jr (8), and pet dog, Sparkle. Williams is a community activist and founder of “Coaches for Change Movement (CFCM)” standing against systemic racism in all its forms, social & economic injustice, police brutality, and voter suppression and making sure ALL athletes, males, and females are educated and informed about what's going on today's every changing society. He currently hosts his weekly Tuesdays Instagram Live talk show “In the Loop with Travis Williams - Exclusive Conversations”.  The talk show is inspiring viewers through sports, faith, family, education, health, and all subjects that matter.

Williams is motivational speaker and educational consultant, and former 18-year NCAA Division I & II, and high school head men's basketball coach.  
Over 30 of Williams’ former players made the “All-Conference Academics Team or Dean’s List”.  He has coached over 25 All-Conference and Region Players, more than 25 ALL-Tourney Team Players, 4 All-American Team Players, and over 45 of his former players have played professionally in the NBA, G-league, WBA (World Basketball Association) semi-pro, and internationally overseas.

Williams returned to his alma mater – Georgia State University – in June 2018 as an assistant men's basketball coach. He was instrumental in helping GSU, “Win Back to Back Sun Belt Conference Tournament Championships, and Advancing to the NCAA March Madness Tournament”, Finishing the 2018–19 season with an impressive 24–10 record!Before returning home to GSU, Williams was the Head Boys Basketball Coach at Maynard H. Jackson High School for two seasons and amassed a winning record of 44–12, 20–3 record at home, and made back to back GHSA State Tournament Playoffs appearance.   During the 2017–18 season, Williams won the “Region 6 Coach of the Year” honors”, and captured the “Regular Season and Tournament Championship”, along with the “GHSA State Playoff “16 Sweet” appearance”.  His team “finished 25-3 overall, 13-1 in region play”, and with a “Top 10 Ranking in the Final Class AAAAA poll”.  Over a two-year coaching period at Maynard Jackson High School, Williams’ team only lost six region games by a combined total of 20 points.  On top of that, Williams coached two Region “Player of the Year winners, two First Team All-Region Players”, and one “Second Team All-Region Players” and led MJHS Boys Basketball Programs to one of the successful runs and historical moments in the school's history (1st Region Championship in the school history).

Prior to coaching in the high school ranks, Williams had a very successful 15-year NCAA Division I & II collegiate, international, and semi-professional coaching career.  He was a former assistant coach (June 2009 - April 2012) and head coach at Tennessee State University when he was elevated to the head coaching position in April 2012. During 2012–13 season at the helm of the Tigers, Williams led his team to an 18–15 record and berth in the CollegeInsider.com Tournament and “Nominated for the 2013 Joe B. Hall award”, presented annually to the top first-year coach in Division I college basketball”. When he joined the Tigers in the summer of 2009, Williams brought 10 years of coaching experience as an assistant and head coach. Williams served as head coach of the Dongguan Parklane Snow Wolf Professional Basketball Club in China's National Basketball League (NBL) to develop the game of basketball in China directly after the 2008 Olympics. He led the team to an impressive 11-2 preseason record before leaving prior to the 2009 regular season to join Tennessee State University staff. Williams also served as an assistant for one season at Mercer University (2007–08) with former head coach Mark Slonaker, (Former Executive Director of UGA Athletics Alumni Relations). That season, Mercer defeated No.17 ranked University of Southern California.

During his three-season stint in the Southern Intercollegiate Athletic Conference (SIAC) at Fort Valley State University, he led the Wildcats to a pair of winning seasons. In the 2006–07 campaign, Williams led FVSU to an 18–12 record. At the conclusion of the season, the Wildcats were ranked 10th in the Division II South Region poll, and made it to the (SIAC) Tournament Championship game.  During that time, FVSU's 18 wins were the most since the 1998–99 season.  Williams’ coaching resume includes stops as the associate head coach with the Southern Crescent Lightning of the World Basketball Association (Championship in 2004 coaching alongside former NBA player and UGA player Litterial Green) and an assistant position at Chicago State (2003-2004). From 1999 to 2003, Travis Williams served as assistant at his alma mater Georgia State University under the tutelage and guidance of head coach Charles “Lefty” Driesell. During his tenure with the Panthers, the program produced three conference regular season championships and one conference tournament championship. While at GSU, the Panthers defeated two Top-25 teams (No. 15 St. Josephs and No. 23 Georgia) and produced an upset over No. 6 seed Wisconsin in the 2001 NCAA Tournament marking the first 20-win season in school history, finishing 29–5. In 2001–02, the Panthers had another 20-win season and advanced to the final game, bowing out by a single point in the Atlantic Sun Conference Tournament Championship game, receiving a bid to the NIT Tournament.

Williams serves on Georgia Sports Hall-of-Fame Committee in Macon, Georgia.  He is a member of the National Association of Basketball Coaches (NABC), and former member of Georgia State University Athletics Hall-of-Fame Committee, the (BCA) Black Coaches and Administrators Association, GHSA (Georgia High School Association), and GACA (Georgia Athletic Coaches Association). As a player, he scored more than 1,000 career points at Georgia State University, voted team captain his junior and senior seasons. Williams was named to three consecutive TAAC All-Academic Conference teams and graduated with a Bachelor's in Business Management in 1995 and a Master's in Sports Administration in 1999. While in graduate school at GSU, Williams interned with the National Football League (NFL) Players Association as a research intern certifying “NFL Sports Agents”.  He is a member of Kappa Alpha Psi fraternity and attends Impact Church in East Point, GA & serves on numerous committees. Williams established “The Patricia Ann Williams Scholarship” in memory of his deceased mother and annually awards financial scholarships to graduating seniors from his alma mater Tift County High School to assist them in college. He also started “Patricia Blessed Closet” providing community outreach, enrichment, educational, nutritional, and clothing programs for under-served & lower economical areas in South Georgia & metro Atlanta.

Williams is truly committed and instrumental in fundraising, volunteerism, community service projects, initiatives, basketball camps, clinics, and finds the necessary time, energy, and resources to give back to the youth in Atlanta, surrounding metro areas, and his hometown of Tifton, Georgia.

Head coaching record

References

1972 births
Living people
American expatriate basketball people in China
Basketball players from Georgia (U.S. state)
Basketball coaches from Georgia (U.S. state)
Chicago State Cougars men's basketball coaches
College men's basketball head coaches in the United States
Georgia State Panthers men's basketball coaches
Georgia State Panthers men's basketball players
Mercer Bears men's basketball coaches
Tennessee State Tigers basketball coaches
American men's basketball players
Forwards (basketball)